Schmerbach is a river of Baden-Württemberg, Germany. It is the right headstream of the Herrgottsbach.

See also
List of rivers of Baden-Württemberg

References

Rivers of Baden-Württemberg
Rivers of Germany

de:Herrgottsbach (Tauber)#Schmerbach